The Vitore (also Gjarpni i Vatrës, Gjarpni i Shtëpisë, Bolla e Shtëpisë or Ora e Shtëpisë) is a household divine serpent (gjarpër or bollë) in Albanian mythology and folklore, associated with human destiny, good fortune and the souls of the ancestors. In folk beliefs the household serpent is strongly related to the cult of the hearth (vatër) and it is especially considered the guardian of the family and the house.

Etymology
The name Vitore has been analyzed as descendant from the Albanian  >  > /, "loom", thus meaning "a spinster, a woman who spins", related to the weaving of fate.

The Albanian terms gjarpën/gjarpër (def.: gjarp(ë)ni/gjarp(ë)ri) and bollë (def.: bolla) mean 'serpent, snake', vatër (def.: vatra) means 'hearth' and shtëpi/shpi (def.: shtëpia/shpia) means 'house'.

Beliefs
The serpent is an animal totem of the Albanians, especially in the north. The belief of the personification of the souls of the ancestors in household serpents has been handed down from prehistoric times. The widespread cult of the serpent among Albanians is related to Illyrian beliefs.

Vitorja is usually described as a small, colourful and benign golden horned serpent. However, in some traditions Vitorja is described also as an old woman, a mythological figure similar to Nëna e Vatrës. Vitorja is also identified with Fatia in southern folklore and Ora in central and northern folklore.

As a serpent, when Vitorja dwell in the walls of a house, it is believed to bring good luck, so the inhabitants treat it with much respect. Its hissing announces important events to the family. The death of the household serpent brings bad luck and even the extinction of the family. The household serpent is said to walk around the house marking the territory it guards.

References

Bibliography

Albanian mythology
Domestic and hearth deities
Snake deities